Kavaleredu Kulavandu (Kannada: ಕವಲೆರೆಡು ಕುಲವೊಂದು) is a 1964 Indian Kannada film, directed by T. V. Singh Thakur and produced by A. C. Narasimha Murthy. The film stars Udaykumar and Jayanthi in the lead roles. The film has musical score by G. K. Venkatesh.

Cast
Udaykumar
Jayashree

References

1960s Kannada-language films
Films scored by G. K. Venkatesh